Fort Lafayette was an island coastal fortification in the Narrows of New York Harbor, built offshore from Fort Hamilton at the southern tip of what is now Bay Ridge in the New York City borough of Brooklyn. The fort was built on a natural island known as Hendrick's Reef. Construction on the fort began during the War of 1812 and was completed in 1822. The fort, originally named Fort Diamond after its shape, was renamed in 1823 to celebrate the Marquis de La Fayette, a hero of the American Revolution who would soon commence a grand tour of the United States. During the American Civil War, the island fort became a prison, mostly for civilians viewed as disloyal to the Union; the fort became known as an "American Bastille." The fort was demolished in 1960 to make room for the Verrazzano-Narrows Bridge; the Brooklyn-side bridge tower now occupies the fort's former foundation site.

Construction
Fort Lafayette was in the form of a square set on end, hence its first name of Fort Diamond. It held approximately 72 cannon (references vary) in three tiers, two in casemates and one in barbette mountings on the roof. The design allowed all the cannon in the southwest front to engage enemy ships entering the Narrows, with the northwest front also engaging if ships passed the fort. The fort was designed at the very end of the second system of US fortifications, and is not fully characteristic of either the second system or the third system. The fort was built of sandstone and brick. The fort was, however, vulnerable to bombardment from Brooklyn, and Fort Hamilton was built circa 1830 to prevent this. In the 1840s, as a captain in the Army Corps of Engineers, Robert E. Lee worked on repairs and improvements to the fort.

Civil War prison

Before 1861, the fort's 72 heavy cannon commanded the primary approaches to the harbor, but during the Civil War, the casemates were used to house Confederate prisoners of war and politicians opposed to the administration's policies, detained under Abraham Lincoln's selective suspension of the writ of habeas corpus. Fort Lafayette came to be known as the "American Bastille" to some.

Robert Cobb Kennedy, formerly a captain in the 1st Louisiana Regular Infantry (CSA), was one of the Confederate conspirators in the plot to burn New York on Thanksgiving Day, 25 November 1864, and was the only one caught. He was imprisoned, court-martialed, and hanged at the fort on 25 March 1865. The plot to burn New York was in retaliation for Sherman burning Atlanta. Several hotels and P. T. Barnum's museum were set on fire.

Francis Key Howard, grandson of Francis Scott Key, was a newspaper editor of the Baltimore Exchange, a newspaper sympathetic to the southern cause. He was arrested on 13 September 1861 by U.S. Major General Nathaniel Prentice Banks on the direct orders of General George B. McClellan, enforcing the policy of President Abraham Lincoln. The basis of his arrest was for writing a critical editorial in his newspaper on Lincoln's suspension of the writ of habeas corpus, and the fact that the Lincoln administration had declared martial law in Baltimore and imprisoned numerous persons without due process, including George William Brown, mayor of Baltimore, Congressman Henry May, the police commissioners of Baltimore, and the entire city council. Howard was then transferred to Fort Lafayette and from there to Fort Warren in Boston harbor.

Later use 
Rebuilt after a catastrophic fire in 1868, the fort was used in 1883 by Edmund Zalinski for experiments with his dynamite gun, which was briefly adopted by both the US Army and US Navy. The fort was used by the Navy for ammunition storage and transfer from 1898-1946. It was demolished in 1960 when the island was used for the base of the Brooklyn tower of the Verrazzano-Narrows Bridge.

References

External links

 Fort Lafayette at New York State Military Museum
 Portals to Hell, book
 The New York Times 1903
 List of prisoners, 1861
  Public Works of the Navy
 American Bastille (1881)
 FortWiki, lists most CONUS and Canadian forts

Installations of the United States Army in New York (state)
New York (state) in the American Civil War
Lafayette
American Civil War prison camps
Military facilities in Brooklyn
Lafayette
Demolished buildings and structures in New York (state)
Buildings and structures demolished in 1960
Demolished buildings and structures in Manhattan
1815 establishments in New York (state)
1960 disestablishments in New York (state)
Former islands of New York City
Islands of Brooklyn